Chrysler House is a 23-story,  skyscraper located at 719 Griswold Street in Downtown Detroit, Michigan. The class-A office building is adjacent to the Penobscot Building in the heart of the U.S. designated Detroit Financial District. It is used as an office building, with retail space on the street level. It was originally known as the Dime Building but has carried numerous names over the years.

History
The building was constructed between 1910 and 1912 and known for many years as the Dime Building. When completed, the tower was named the Dime Savings Bank Building for its primary tenant. It was later renamed the Commonwealth Building, briefly known as Griswold Place. It became the Dime Building again in 2002, before being renamed in 2012.

The original Lincoln Highway Association national headquarters occupied office 2115 on the 21st floor from 1913 to 1928.

For several years through 1983, the building housed the headquarters of Bank of the Commonwealth until that bank merged with Comerica. In 2002, a $40-million renovation was completed.

In August 2011, Quicken Loans founder Dan Gilbert purchased the building along with the nearby Qube, First National Building and Wright-Kay Building.On April 30, 2012, Gilbert and Chrysler Group LLC chairman Sergio Marchionne announced that Chrysler will move its Great Lakes Business Center and some executive offices, with approximately 70 employees, into the two top floors of the building. As part of the lease, the building was renamed for the company.

Architecture
The tower was designed in the Neoclassical architectural style by Daniel Burnham. The steel-framed structure is faced with white glazed brick and terra cotta trim. The most distinctive feature is the central light court which begins on the third floor and creates a U-shaped floor plan on the upper office floors. This feature can be seen in an earlier version on Burnham's Miner's National Bank Building, now Citizens Bank financial Center, completed one year earlier in downtown Wilkes-Barre, Pennsylvania. Miner's National Bank is a similar, but smaller-scale design with the main banking hall in the space below the light court and featuring a large skylight. A later expansion of the building altered the U-shape of the upper floors.

In a subsequent renovation, the lower two floors were refaced with gray granite and a pediment above the central entrance and cornice were removed.

Gallery

See also

List of tallest buildings in Detroit
FCA US LLC Headquarters and Technology Center
Sergio Marchionne

References

Further reading

Duggan, Daniel. "Dime Building renamed Chrysler House as automaker moves workers into space in downtown Detroit." Crain's Detroit Business. April 30, 2012.
Hoffman, Bryce G. "Chrysler opens Detroit office in former Dime Building." The Detroit News. September 24, 2012.
Gallagher, John. "Quicken Loans helps welcome Chrysler to historic new digs today." Detroit Free Press. April 30, 2012.
"Marchionne, 70 employees moving to Detroit's Dime Building." The Detroit News.

Skyscraper office buildings in Detroit
Downtown Detroit
Office buildings completed in 1912
Office buildings on the National Register of Historic Places in Michigan
National Register of Historic Places in Detroit
Historic district contributing properties in Michigan
Rock Ventures
1912 establishments in Michigan
1910s architecture in the United States